Zdechovice is a municipality and village in Pardubice District in the Pardubice Region of the Czech Republic. It has about 600 inhabitants.

Administrative parts
The village of Spytovice and the hamlet of Zbraněves are administrative parts of Zdechovice.

References

External links

Villages in Pardubice District